Badab Soort is a natural site in Mazandaran Province in northern Iran,  south-east of the city of Sari, and  east of Orost village. It comprises a range of stepped travertine terrace formations that have been created over thousands of years as flowing water from two mineral hot springs cooled and deposited carbonate minerals on the mountainside.

Etymology
Badab is a Persian compound of Bād "gas" + āb "water", translating to "gassed water", referring to the springs' waters being carbonated mineral waters. Soort is an old name for the Orost village and a Persian word meaning intensity.

Geology

The first spring contains very salty water that gathers in a small natural pool; its water is considered to have medicinal properties, especially as a cure for rheumatism and some types of skin diseases and skin conditions. The second spring has a sour taste and is predominantly orange mainly due to the large iron oxide sediments at its outlet.

Badab Soort's terraces are made of travertine, a sedimentary rock deposited by flowing water from the two distinct mineral springs; they were formed during Pleistocene and Pliocene geological periods. When the water, supersaturated with calcium carbonate and iron carbonate, reaches the surface, carbon dioxide degases from it, and mineral carbonates are deposited. The depositing continues until the carbon dioxide in the water balances the carbon dioxide in the air. Iron carbonate and calcium carbonate are deposited by the water as soft jellies, but they eventually harden into travertine.

As a result, over the course of thousands of years the water from these two springs emanating from the mountain range have combined and resulted in a number of orange-, red- and yellow-colored pools shaped as a naturally formed staircase. The surrounding vegetation to the north consists of pine forests while to the east it mainly consists of short trees and shrubs; and rock quarries can be seen to the west of the site.

Panoramic view

Similar places 
Mammoth Hot Springs in the USA
Pamukkale in Turkey
Huanglong Scenic and Historic Interest Area in China

References

External links 

Wikimapia
Samaee Gallery
Badab Soort pictures by Bamdadan

Limestone
Sedimentary rocks
Geography of Mazandaran Province
Geography of Iran
Tourist attractions in Mazandaran Province
Tourist attractions in Sari